Glycera (the sweet one) was a popular name often used for Hellenistic hetaerae, held by:
The daughter of Thalassis and the mistress of Harpalus and Menander. (Athen. xiii. pp. 586, 595, 605, &c.)
The mistress of Pausias, born in Sicyon.
A favourite of Horace(?). (Hor. Carm. i. 19. 30. iii. 19.29.)
Nominally, Alcibiades's sexual partner in Caracci's engravings for I Modi.

Harpalus's mistress
Originating from Athens in the second half of the 4th century BC.  After the death of his previous mistress Pythionice (between 329 BC and 324 BC), Harpalus obtained Glycera using funds derived from his office.  In return for her Harpalus sent grain to Athens and guaranteed their citizenship rights.

She accompanied Harpalus in his escape from India with Alexander, and later returned to Athens, where she allegedly became the love of the poet Menander.

Sources
"There were other courtesans also who thought very highly of themselves, going in for culture and apportioning their time to learned studies; hence they also were quick in making answers. For example, Stilpo was once accusing Glycera, while they were drinking together, of corrupting the young men, as Satyrus tell in his Lives, when Glycera interrupted: "We both fall under the same charge, Stilpo. For they say that you corrupt all who meet you by teaching them good-for-nothing, eristic sophistries, while I in like manner teach them erotic. It makes no difference, therefore, to people who are ruined and injured, whether they live in the company of a philosopher or of a courtesan." In fact, as Agathon says: "Truly a woman, just because she is inactive in body, need not for that reason carry an inactive mind within her."
The poet Menander having met with bad luck entered the house of Glycera, who brought him some boiled milk and urged him to drink it down. But he said, "I don't want it." For there was scum on the top of it. She said, "Blow it off and use what's underneath." .........
Leontion was reclining at dinner with a lover when Glycera came into the symposium later; and when the lover paid more devoted attention to her, Leontion looked downcast. Her friend, turning toward her, asked what pained her. She replied, "The last comer gives me a pain!" ....
Hypereides, again, in the Speech against Mantitheus, in an action for assault, has this to say about Glycera: "Taking with him Glycera, daughter of Thalassis, in a chariot and pair." It is uncertain whether she is the Glycera who lived with Harpalus; of her Theopompus says, in his treatise On the Chian Letter, that after the death of Pythionice Harpalus summoned Glycera from Athens; on her arrival she took up her residence in the palace at Tarsus and had obeisance done to her by the populace, being hailed as queen; further, all persons were forbidden to honour Harpalus with a crown unless they also gave a crown to Glycera. In Rhossus they even went so far as to set up an image of her in bronze beside his own. The like is recorded also by Cleitarchus in his Histories of Alexander. The author of Agen, the little satyric drama, whether it be Python of Catana or King Alexander himself, say: "A. And yet I hear that Harpalus has sent over to them thousands of bushels of grain, as many as Agen sent, and so was made a citizen. B. This grain was Glycera's, but it will doubtless turn out to be their death-warrant, and not merely a whore's earnest money." ........
That the poet Menander, also, was in love with Glycera is a matter of common knowledge. But he became angry at her; for when Philemon fell in love with a courtesan and called her in his play "good," Menander in answer wrote that no woman is good."

Fictional

One of the images of sexual positions in Agostino Carracci's engravings for I Modi is entitled 'Alcibiades and Glycera'.  This is not meant to be a portrait of any of the historical Glyceras, for the identification is only nominal, acting as a thin classical veneer for the image's erotic or pornographic intent.  These engraving's titles usually use a historically verified pair of lovers (e.g. Dido and Aeneas), but that is not the case here - Glycera is 4th century BC whilst Alcibiades is 5th century BC - making the veneer here even thinner than usual.

Sources
Post, L.A.; "Woman's Place in Menander's Athens", Transactions and Proceedings of the American Philological Association, Vol. 71, 1940, pp. 420–459
Ancient Library

Notes

Ancient Athenians
Hetairai
Greek female prostitutes